Ten Network Holdings Ltd, commonly referred as Paramount Australia & New Zealand, is a major media company in Australia. Headquartered in Sydney, its major asset is Network 10, a free-to-air television network. Formerly a public company listed on the Australian Securities Exchange, since December 2019, it has been a  subsidiary of Paramount Networks UK & Australia.

Assets
While originally focusing on running a television network, Ten has recently diversified into a range of other media areas over the past decade. Below are some of the businesses it has run, or is involved with:

 Network 10 is an Australian commercial free-to-air television primary channel
 Sydney
 Melbourne
 Brisbane
 Adelaide
 Perth
 10 HD is an Australian free-to-air HD digital television multichannel using the primary channel simulcast.
 10 Bold is an Australian free-to-air digital television multichannel dramatic programming aimed towards viewers over 40.
 10 Peach is an Australian free-to-air digital television multichannel featuring comedy, sitcoms and some drama programs.
 10 Shake is an Australian free-to-air digital television multichannel includes a mix of shows for people under 40.
 10 Play a video on demand, catch-up TV service which carries the main and multichannels of Network 10.
 Gecko is an Australian free-to-air datacasting channel
 Multi Channel Network (25%)

History

Establishment and relationship with The Ten Group
Ten Network Holdings (TNH) was established in 1998. It allowed shareholders to invest in The Ten Group Pty Ltd, the owner of the Ten television network. TNH had a 79% shareholding in The Ten Group, representing a 39% economic interest in the group. Canadian media company Canwest had a 58% economic interest in The Ten Group and was the Group's other major owner. In June 2007, Canwest decided to convert its stake in The Ten Group into shares in Ten Network Holdings, giving it a 56% shareholding in TNH. This saw TNH take 99% ownership of The Ten Group and become the central company in Ten's corporate structure. In February 2008, the other shareholders in The Ten Group exchanged their shares in that company for shares in TNH, giving TNH 100% ownership of The Ten Group.

Sale to Canwest
On 24 September 2009, Canwest announced that it was selling its 50.1% stake in Ten Network Holdings for A$680 million (following the 2006 concentration/restriction on Australian media ownership), in order to pay down its significant debt, although it was not enough to save the former parent, which went out of business the next year.

James Packer share purchase
During October 2010, James Packer through Consolidated Press Holdings, bought an 18% shareholding. Half of this was then bought from Packer by Lachlan Murdoch; the two are listed as joint owners of 17.88% of the company

On 26 November mining magnate and Australia's wealthiest woman, Gina Rinehart was appointed a position of the board after purchasing 10% of the company.

Speculation surrounds the future of the Packer investment as upcoming changes to sport broadcast regulation and Ten's low share price in a slowly resurgent market are seen as possible drivers for the current stake.

On 23 February 2011, the board of Ten Network Holdings terminated the contract of CEO Grant Blackley. Lachlan Murdoch was appointed acting CEO. In February 2012, Murdoch was appointed Chairman by the board, replacing Brian Long who became Deputy Chairman, with James Warburton as the company's CEO.

On 26 March 2014 Hamish McLennan was appointed Executive Chairman after becoming Chief Executive Officer and Managing Director of the company in March 2013 replacing James Warburton. Lachlan Murdoch retired as Chairman and a Director to join News Corp and 21st Century Fox as Non-Executive Co-Chairman.

On 27 July 2015, Paul Anderson was appointed Chief Executive Officer, and Non-Executive Director David Gordon was appointed chairman after Hamish McLennan stepped down from both roles.

On 11 March 2020, Paul Anderson stepped down from his position and he was not directly replaced with Beverley McGarvey promoted to become Chief Content Officer and Executive Vice President across Ten and ViacomCBS Australia & NZ.

Foxtel takeover bid
In 2014, News Corp/Telstra-owned Foxtel and U.S. cable company Discovery Communications made a joint-venture to take a bid on Ten. Other U.S.-based companies and investment firms, such as Anchorage Capital Group and Saban Capital Group, were also on the bidding list. However, this was opposed by WIN Corporation owner and Ten shareholder Bruce Gordon stating that Ten would remain in the Australian hands.

On 15 June 2015, Foxtel officially agreed to buyout 15% shares in Ten Network Holdings, pending the approval from the Australian Competition & Consumer Commission. Prior to the acquisition, Discovery backed out from bidding partnership with Foxtel.

There were numerous reports stated that Foxtel will push-through the 15% acquisition of Ten once the Australian government will abolish the restriction on cross-media ownership.

2017 financial turmoil
Announcing an AU$232 million half-year loss in 2017, Ten Network Holdings warned that there was "significant doubt on the group's ability to continue" and their future hinged on an extension or renewal of an AU$200 million debt guarantee by three of its largest shareholders Lachlan Murdoch, Bruce Gordon and James Packer which expires on 23 December 2017. In June 2017, Murdoch, Gordon and Packer withdrew support for a $250 million guaranteed loan that would remedy the expiring $200 million debt guarantee. In response, Ten requested its shares on the Australian Securities Exchange be placed in a 48-hour trading halt while it assessed its options concerning receivership. On 14 June, Ten went into voluntary administration.

Purchase by CBS 
Upon the news of receivership, Ten's largest shareholders (Murdoch and Gordon) attempted to merge their assets to save Network 10. The Australian Competition & Consumer Commission even stated that they will not oppose the said merger bid, which would saw both shareholders enjoying a 50% stake in the network.

However, on 28 August 2017, Ten's administrators announced that the U.S. media company CBS Corporation (which has a 33% share in channel Eleven) had entered into a binding agreement to purchase the company for $123 million, subject to approval of the Foreign Investment Review Board. CBS refinanced Ten's existing debt including guarantor fees to billionaire shareholders James Packer, Lachlan Murdoch and Bruce Gordon, and existing loans from the Commonwealth Bank. As a result, once the deal is approved, CBS will take over in full with current shareholders losing their shares and its value.

Gordon and Murdoch, whose joint bid for the company has not been accepted, went to the Supreme Court of New South Wales in an effort to delay CBS's takeover of Ten. This delayed the administrator's meeting with creditors until 12 September. At the meeting, creditors overwhelmingly voted in support of CBS' bid, citing concerns over Murdoch's management of Ten over the past years and talk of mass job cuts in the news department under Murdoch ownership. On 10 November 2017, the Supreme Court approved the purchase.

On 16 November 2017 the purchase by CBS was completed and shares were transferred to CBS Network 10 BV, a company registered in the Netherlands.
 The company became a division of CBS Studios International.
The company launched the news, entertainment and lifestyle website 10 daily in May 2018. The site was conceived while Ten Network Holdings was an independent company and was intended to launch in September 2017. The site was shut down on 22 May 2020.

On 31 October 2018, the network unveiled a new logo, replacing the "ten" wordmark used since 1991 with a stylised circle 10, and the network now referred to in text as "Network 10". The new brand is used across all of Network 10's platforms and services, and was intended to reflect the broadcaster's positioning as an "adventurous alternative" with a "sense of fun". 10 also relaunched its multichannels Eleven and One as 10 Peach and 10 Boss (now 10 Bold), with Bold focusing on dramatic programming and targeting an older adult audience, and Peach continuing to be targeted towards young adults. In December 2018, the network launched 10 All Access, a localised version of the American streaming service CBS All Access with a selection of ad-free programming from both CBS and Network 10. The service was rebranded as Paramount+ on 11 August 2021.

CBS merger with Viacom
In December 2019, the parent company CBS Corporation re-merged with Viacom, forming ViacomCBS and making Network 10 a sister to Viacom channels in Australia (MTV, Nickelodeon etc.) as well as international networks such as Channel 5 in the United Kingdom.

In July 2020, it was announced that a new multichannel called 10 Shake will launch in September 2020. The channel will target an under 40s audience during prime time, drawing upon "edgy" content which became available throughout the ViacomCBS merger (including television brands from Nickelodeon, MTV and Comedy Central), but 10 normally also shares their ViacomCBS television programs with Nine Network because the studio didn’t want have so many of ViacomCBS television rights. The breakdown for the channel is children's programming before 6pm and "edgy" content for under-40 viewers at night.

References

External links
Paramount ANZ

Network 10
Companies based in Sydney
Television broadcasting companies of Australia
Companies formerly listed on the Australian Securities Exchange
Australian companies established in 1998
Mass media companies established in 1998
Holding companies established in 1998
Holding companies of Australia
Former Corus Entertainment subsidiaries
2017 mergers and acquisitions
Australian subsidiaries of foreign companies
Paramount Global subsidiaries